Kent Johan Mikael Eskilandersson (born 1977) is a Swedish politician and a member of the Riksdag for the Sweden Democrats party representing the Skåne County North and East constituency. 

Eskilandersson worked in forestry before getting involved in politics. He was elected to the Swedish parliament in 2014, initially for Gävleborg County constituency before contesting Skåne Northern for the 2018 Swedish general election.

In parliament, he has been a member of the civil affairs committee since 2014 and joined the Riksbank's (financial department of the Riksdag) executive committee in 2018.

References 

Living people
1977 births
Members of the Riksdag 2014–2018
Members of the Riksdag 2018–2022
Members of the Riksdag from the Sweden Democrats
Members of the Riksdag 2022–2026
21st-century Swedish politicians